Kenya Television Network (KTN) is a Kenyan free-to-air television network that was launched in March 1990 by Jared Kangwana. It is headquartered at Standard Group Centre, Nairobi. It was the first free-to-air privately owned television network in Africa, and the first to break KBC's monopoly in Kenya.

KTN became famous for activist journalism in the 1990s.

History

After its launch in 1990, KTN used to rebroadcast programming from CNN International, MTV Europe and other European, American and Australian television channels, in addition to TV networks from other African states. KTN started out as a pilot project for a 24-hour subscription-television channel in Nairobi and its surroundings, but plans to scramble its signal were abandoned and for most of the 1990s, KTN derived its revenue from advertisement and TV production services. Founded by Jared Kangwana, its early success attracted bids for joint ownership by London-based Maxwell Communications, by South African MNET, and by the then-ruling party Kenya African National Union (KANU).
The station won the bid to carry the 1992 Summer Olympics, as well as the rights to several other international events.

While Jared Kangwana had plans to expand KTN, and had built new facilities to house the station, he allowed free rein to KTN's news division. KANU functionaries are said to have frequently called the newsroom and editors on behalf of the president of Kenya, Daniel arap Moi, in order to censor news stories. Such control was said to have been sanctioned by Moi himself, who had developed the habit while he was still vice-president under president Jomo Kenyatta. As vice-president, Daniel arap Moi had grown used to make regular calls to the offices of The Standard which was foreign-owned at that time, and to other media outlets, to demand that they drop stories or modify them. The practice was revived when KTN was established.

In October 1993 security officers boarded a commercial airliner, seized the passport of KTN Director Jared Kangwana, and prevented him from departing on a business trip. Kangwana said that the act was part of a government intimidation campaign to force him to relinquish control of KTN to the then-ruling party, KANU. The government took no action to institute criminal proceedings against Kangwana but ultimately succeeded in forcing him to cede the company to KANU. The station is now part of The Standard Group, which also publishes The Standard newspaper.

Programs
KTN was once a juggernaut in entertainment but has now been flooded with soap operas, long talk shows and CNN night time streaming (Some world class entertainment namely sitcoms, thriller/detective, drama, action series and children's classics have all vanished).

Listed below are some of the shows the network was famous for;

Former

Imported shows

Children's 
 Adventures from the Book of Virtues
 Alvin and the Chipmunks
 Animaniacs
 Art Attack
 Barney & Friends
 Justice League (TV series)
 Superman The Animated Series
 Batman of the Future
 Batman: The Animated Series
 Bob in a Bottle
   Braceface
 Captain Planet and the Planeteers
 Casper the Friendly Ghost
 Count Duckula
  Denver, the Last Dinosaur
 The Fairly OddParents!
 Felix the Cat
 The Flintstones
 Gerry Anderson's New Captain Scarlet
 Hi-5
  Jackie Chan Adventures
  Jim Henson's The Hoobs
 Johnny Bravo
 Kim Possible
 The Little Rascals
 Mission Top Secret
 The New Adventures of Kimba The White Lion
 The Odyssey
 Out of the Box
 The Puzzle Place
 The Real Ghostbusters
 Recess
 The Road Runner Show
  Saban's Adventures of the Little Mermaid
 SilverHawks
  Star Wars: Ewoks
 Tom & Jerry Kids
 X-Men: Evolution
 American Dragon:Jake Long
 The Proud Family
 Atomic Betty
 Jacob Two Two
 6teen
 The Wild Thornberrys
 Lilo & Stitch
 Johnny Test
 Justice League
 My life as a teenage robot
 Danny Phantom
 Braceface
 Hey Arnold

Drama
 Baywatch
 The Commish
 Desperate Housewives
 ER
 Judging Amy
  Kung Fu: The Legend Continues
 Lois & Clark: The New Adventures of Superman
 Lost
 L.A. Law
 Monk
 Murphy Brown
 Renegrade
  Time Trax

Reality
 The Rebel Billionaire: Branson's Quest for the Best
 Beyond Chance

Soap Opera
 Egoli: Place of Gold
 Fashion House
 Melrose Place
 The Stepdaughters
 Impostora
 The General's Daughter
 The Promise
 A Love to Last
 Lost Hearts
 Doble Kara
 A Mother's Guilt
 Prima Donnas
 Los Bastardos

Comedy
 The Benny Hill Show
 Desmond's
 Diff'rent Strokes
 Eve
 Full House
 Golden Girls
 Hangin' with Mr. Cooper
 Herman's Head
 The Jeffersons
 Kate & Allie
 Less Than Perfect
 The Muppet Show
 Nurses
 Perfect Strangers
 Sanford and Son
 Sister, Sister

Talk Shows
 The Oprah Winfrey Show
 Tyra Banks Show

Game Shows
 You Bet Your Life

Anthology
 This Is the Life

References

External links
ktnkenya.tv
museum.tv
KTN Live Stream - Kenyan TV

Television stations in Kenya
Mass media in Nairobi
Television channels and stations established in 1990